Chiwanki Lyainga ( – 3 February 2014) was a Zambian football player from Lusaka, Zambia.

Club career
Lyainga played for Zambian football clubs Red Arrows and Power Dynamos.

International career
Lyainga earned two caps for Zambia in 2008, scoring one goal in a friendly match against Libya. He was a member of Zambia's squad for the 2008 COSAFA Cup.

Death
Lyainga, aged 30, died in a Lusaka hospital after being stabbed in Chawama Township. Police believe he got into an argument with a bar patron and was killed in retaliation.

References

External links

Date of birth missing
1983 births
2014 deaths
Sportspeople from Lusaka
Association football midfielders
Zambia international footballers
Deaths by stabbing in Zambia
Male murder victims
People murdered in Zambia
Zambian murder victims
Power Dynamos F.C. players
Red Arrows F.C. players
Young Arrows F.C. players
Zambian footballers